Srijana Regmi (born December 28, 1992) is a Nepalese model, beauty pageant, and actress. 
She was a top-five finalist at the Miss Nepal 2016 beauty pageant and represented Nepal at the Miss Grand International 2014.

Srijana graduated in business studies from the Kathmandu College of Management.

Career
Srijana started her modelling career at the age of 20, when she first competed in Joy Papaya Glam Hunt where she won the main title and was chosen to represent Nepal at Miss Grand International 2014 in Sukhothai, Thailand.

Srijana walked at the Nepal Fashion Week from 2014 till 2016 and has appeared in Nepalese fashion magazines Wave, Nari, Naavyata, TNM Magazine, and Movers & Shakers Nepal etc.

Srijana participated in the Miss Nepal 2016 competition as contestant number 16 and she won the sub title of Miss Talent and managed to place fourth overall in the contest.

Music 
Srijana is due to release her debut album titled 'Dreams Under A Rhododendron Tree'. As of May 2022, two songs from the album has already been released through her YouTube channel.  The first song was titled 'Murder Mountain'  and the second song from her album was titled 'Floods in Spring'.

References

"Asmi Shrestha won Miss Nepal 2016" Lagatar.com. Retrieved 8 April 2016.

External links
 Official website
 Dreams Under A Rhododendron Tree Album   

1992 births
Living people
Miss Nepal winners
Nepalese female models
Nepalese film actresses
Actresses in Nepali cinema
21st-century Nepalese actresses
Nepalese beauty pageant winners
People from Sankhuwasabha District